Colin Griffiths (9 December 1930 – 14 September 2004) was an English cricketer. He played for Essex between 1951 and 1953.

Griffiths was educated at Brentwood School, Essex, and played cricket briefly as an amateur batsman before going into his family's demolition business. In 1952, going into the match with a first-class batting average of 12 and a highest score of 31, he hit the fastest first-class hundred of the season, 105 in 90 minutes for Essex against Kent, when he batted at No. 9 and added 183 for the eighth wicket in 90 minutes with Trevor Bailey. Essex won by an innings. Against Middlesex a few days later he scored 89, again at No. 9, and 25 retired hurt, his second innings ending when he pulled a back muscle while hitting a six.

Griffiths lost interest in cricket after leaving Essex. After some years in the family business, he pursued other interests and finished his working career as the head of a residential unit for disturbed adolescents.

References

External links

1930 births
2004 deaths
People educated at Brentwood School, Essex
English cricketers
Essex cricketers
People from Upminster